John Swinnerton Phillimore (26 February 1873 – 16 November 1926) was a British classical scholar, translator, and poet. 

Born at Boconnoc in Cornwall, Phillimore was, like his father, Augustus Phillimore before him, and four brothers, educated at Westminster School (1886-91), where he was a Queen's Scholar, before going on to read Literae Humaniores  at Christ Church, Oxford, where he was also President of the Oxford Union. After taking his degree, he remained at Christ Church as a Student (Fellow and Tutor) until 1899, when he was made Professor of Greek at the University of Glasgow; in 1906 he became Professor of Humanity there, a position he held until his death. Though he was invited to give the Sather Lectures at the University of California, Berkeley, he was unable to do so because of the First World War. Phillimore was a convert to Roman Catholicism.

Works
 Poems. Glasgow: James MacLehose & Sons, 1902
The Athenian Drama, vol. ii, Sophocles. London: George Allen & Unwin, Ltd., 1902 
Propertius. Oxford: Clarendon Press, 1906
 Things New and Old. London: Humphrey Milford, 1918
 Some Remarks on Translation and Translators. Oxford: The English Association, 1919
 The Hundred Best Latin Hymns. Glasgow: Gowans & Gray, 1926

References

1873 births
1926 deaths
Academics of the University of Glasgow
Alumni of Christ Church, Oxford
British poets
Fellows of Christ Church, Oxford
People from Cornwall
Presidents of the Oxford Union